Lorenzo Natali Pierucci Bondicchi (1922–1989) was an Italian politician for Christian Democracy, and a European Commissioner from 1977 to 1989.

Early life and career
Natali's parents were born in Colle di Buggiano, in the province of Pistoia. His mother was a countess, while his father was the son of a farmer, but he graduated in medicine. In 1925 his father won a primary position at the hospital in L'Aquila and the whole family moved to Abruzzo. Natali grew up and lived in L'Aquila. In 1929, Natali's mother died in childbirth.

Natali was greatly influenced by his father, a convinced anti-fascist. He obtained his classical high school diploma at the Domenico Cotugno high school in L'Aquila, then moved to Colle di Buggiano to study law in Florence. After graduation he became a lawyer.

During the Second World War Natali was responsible for the Catholic youth groups in L'Aquila. He joined the Italian Liberation Corps as a volunteer and participated in the fight against the Nazi-fascists from June 16 to July 17, 1944 in the ranks of the 4th XXXIII Bersaglieri regiment. On July 17 he was wounded in battle on the Musone nelle Marche river, and on April 27 1945 he received the Cross for Military Valor.

Political career
In 1955 Natali was appointed Undersecretary to the Presidency of the Council of Ministers for the press and information within the Segni I government. In this capacity he participated in the signing of the Treaty of Rome on 25 March 1957. Subsequently he held the positions of undersecretary of the ministry of finance (Zoli government and Fanfani II government) and of the treasury ministry (Tambroni government, Fanfani III government, Fanfani IV government, Leone I government and Moro I government).

In 1966 he was appointed minister for the first time and joined the Moro III government as Minister of Merchant Marine. Later he was Minister of Public Works in the Leone II and Rumor II Governments, Minister of Tourism and Entertainment in the Rumor I Government and Minister of Agriculture in the Rumor III, Colombo, Andreotti I and II Governments.

He served as Vice-President of the European Commission and Commissioner for Enlargement, Environment and Nuclear Safety in the Jenkins Commission from 1977 to 1981. He then served as Vice-President and Commissioner for Mediterranean Policy, Enlargement and Information in the Thorn Commission from 1981 to 1985. He was Vice-President and held the portfolio of Cooperation, Development Affairs and Enlargement in the Delors Commission from 1985 to 1989. He was a government minister in Italy from 1966 to 1972 and served as Minister of Agriculture from 1970.

The Lorenzo Natali Media Prize, a journalism prize awarded annually by the European Commission's Directorate-General for International Partnerships, is named in his honour.

References

External links

Italian European Commissioners
1922 births
1989 deaths
Christian Democracy (Italy) politicians
European Commissioners 1977–1981
European Commissioners 1981–1985
European Commissioners 1985–1988